The 2015 Tennessee Volunteers football team represented the University of Tennessee in the 2015 season. This was the 119th overall season, 82nd as a member of the Southeastern Conference (SEC), and its 24th within the SEC Eastern Division. The team was coached by Butch Jones, in his third season with UT, and plays their home games at Neyland Stadium in Knoxville. This season was also the debut season of Mike DeBord as UT's offensive coordinator.

The Vols finished the regular season at 8–4, 5–3 in the SEC, making them bowl-eligible for a second consecutive season. On December 6, 2015, it was announced that the Vols would face the Northwestern Wildcats (10–2) in the Outback Bowl in Tampa, Florida, on January 1, 2016.  Tennessee defeated the Wildcats 45–6, finishing the season at 9–4.

Previous season
The 2014 Tennessee Volunteers football team finished the regular season 6–6, with a highlight win against Vanderbilt, which enabled the Vols to become bowl-eligible for the first time since the 2010 season. The Vols were invited to play in the 2015 TaxSlayer Bowl against the Iowa Hawkeyes of the Big Ten Conference. Tennessee defeated the Hawkeyes in Jacksonville, Florida 45–28, finishing their 2014 season at 7–6. It was their first winning season since 2009, and the first bowl win since 2007.

Offseason

Spring practice
The Tennessee Volunteers opened up Spring Practice on March 21. Much like in 2014, Joshua Dobbs entered spring practice having finished the season as the starting quarterback due to injuries to Justin Worley. With Worley having graduated, however, Dobbs is now the clear frontrunner for the starting quarterback role. The coaches noted that he was being more consistent and efficient with signal calling and ball throwing. "The thing I liked about Josh today is that I thought he made the routine plays", Butch Jones told the VolQuest.com crew after UT's first day in pads Saturday. "He made the routine throws." Coleman Thomas, who was a starting offensive tackle, was suspended from the team activities in the wake of legal issues. Starting cornerback Emmanuel Moseley missed part of spring practice after contracting mono.  Numerous players, including Derek Barnett, Marcus Jackson, Danny O'Brien, Jason Croom, Curt Maggitt, Jakob Johnson, Alex Ellis and early enrollees Kyle Phillips and Darrin Kirkland, missed the entire spring due to injuries.  Others, including Jalen Hurd, Marquez North and Dillon Bates, were limited by injuries.

Post-spring practice
On May 21, 2015, following UT's Big Orange Caravan stop at Nissan Stadium, Coach Jones stated "We just can't be a year older. We have to be a year better, and that's part of that growth and that development." He added, "We'll still be exceptionally young in the defensive front. We're going to rely on two true freshman defensive tackles (Kahlil McKenzie and Shy Tuttle) to really play a big part in this year's outcome of many games, so we have to get them ready to go. But our older players have done a great job of mentoring the young players coming in. On the offensive front, we had some individuals who gained some valuable experience. You could see that kind of manifesting itself throughout the course of spring. You could see that confidence. You could see a change in strength levels. You could see a change in maturity, and also just in football knowledge."

Fall practice

The Vols began fall practice on August 4, 2015.  Primary concerns involved the return of numerous players from injury, the improvement of the offensive line, finding starters at middle linebacker (to replace A.J. Johnson), left tackle (to replace Jacob Gilliam), and punter (to replace Matt Darr), and determining a backup quarterback. Prior to the beginning of fall practice, freshman quarterback Jauan Jennings announced he was switching to wide receiver, leaving freshman early enrollee Quinten Dormady and summer enrollee Sheriron Jones to compete for the backup quarterback slot.  In mid-August, Butch Jones designated Dormady as the backup. Six players competed for the starting slot at middle linebacker: junior Kenny Bynum, sophomore Jakob Johnson, sophomore Gavin Bryant, sophomore walk-on Colton Jumper, redshirt freshman Dillon Bates, and freshman Darrin Kirkland, though Johnson eventually switched to tight end. In late August, Jones stated the competition was down to Kirkland and Jumper. Nate Renfro (a graduate transfer from Maryland), sophomore walk-on Trevor Daniel, and freshman Tommy Townsend were competing for the starting slot at punter.

Injuries continued to be a factor during fall practice.  Senior offensive guard Marcus Jackson (a returning starter), junior offensive guard Austin Sanders, and sophomore defensive back Rashaan Gaulden (the projected starter at nickelback) all suffered season-ending injuries. Junior wide receivers Marquez North and Jason Croom, sophomore guard Jashon Robertson, and junior college transfer Justin Martin were among the players who missed portions of fall practice due to injuries.

Alton "Pig" Howard, leading wide-receiver from the 2014 season, was suspended for the first game of the season for unspecified violation of team rules. During his daily media availability on August 27, Coach Jones said that it wasn't "something that just occurred" and that it's "something that dates back many months." "To Alton's credit, I like the way he's approached training camp", he added. "He's had the best training camp that he's had since we've been here. I'm appreciative of his efforts, but he will miss the Bowling Green game." Coach Jones also announced that strong safety LaDarrell McNeil would miss extended time due to a neck injury. After his media session, Coach Jones took to Twitter to "officially" welcome Preston Williams – who was flagged by the NCAA Clearinghouse to retake the ACT Test – to the team.

Personnel

Roster & staff

2015 recruiting class
Tennessee's 2015 recruiting class is ranked the third-best overall 2015 class by 247Sports.com, fourth-best by Rivals.com, and fifth-best by Scout.com.

Depth chart

Schedule
Tennessee announced their 2015 football schedule on October 14, 2014. The 2015 schedule consisted of seven home games, four away games, and one neutral site game in the regular season. The Volunteers hosted SEC foes Arkansas, Georgia, South Carolina, and Vanderbilt, and traveled to Alabama, Florida, Kentucky, and Missouri.

Tennessee opened the season at a neutral site for the first time since 2012 at Nissan Stadium in Nashville, against Bowling Green. The Vols then hosted Oklahoma for the second game of the home series. Western Carolina then traveled to Neyland Stadium for the first meeting between the two schools. To end the non–conference match ups, North Texas will make a trip to Knoxville for the second meeting of the two schools. North Texas defeated the Vols in their first meeting in 1975, 21–14. The Arkansas–Tennessee match up will be the first time since they play against each other since 2011. The Kentucky–Tennessee match up will be played in October (on Halloween) for the first time since 1909.

Tennessee had originally scheduled UAB as its 2015 season opener. On December 2, 2014, however, UAB announced they were shutting down their football program at the end of the 2014–15 academic year. (UAB announced in June 2015 that it would be bringing back the program for a 2017 debut.) The shutdown led Tennessee to find a new team to open against at Nissan Stadium. A week later the Vols announced that Bowling Green will replace UAB in the opener of the 2015 season, for the first meeting between the two schools.

Schedule Source:

Game summaries

Bowling Green 

The 2015 Tennessee Volunteers, ranked 25th in the nation,  kicked off its first game of the season against the Bowling Green Falcons at Nissan Stadium in Nashville, Tennessee. Jalen Hurd had three first-half touchdown runs, Alvin Kamara ran for two more scores, and Tennessee went on to win 59–30 in a game delayed 80 minutes in the second half by lightning.

#19 Oklahoma 

The 19th-ranked Oklahoma Sooners played the 23rd-ranked Volunteers for the fourth time in history, the first in Knoxville.Derek Barnett, Chris Weatherd, Curt Maggit, Cam Sutton, and Brian Randolph were key contributors on the Vols defense. The Volunteers led 17–3 into the fourth quarter, but the Sooners came back to force the game into two overtime periods and win 31–24. The game's live broadcast on ESPN was watched by 4.12 million viewers, making it the most-watched cable program of the day.

Western Carolina 

In Knoxville, the Volunteers faced the Western Carolina Catamounts for the first time ever and won 55–10. Alvin Kamara became the first Tennessee player in 40 years to score on a punt return (50 yards) and a run from scrimmage in the same game. Coupling Kamara's return with Evan Berry's 88-yard kickoff return, prior to the end of the first half, also marked a first for special teams scoring since a 1950 victory over Washington and Lee.

Regarding heading into the game following the loss to Oklahoma, Coach Butch Jones commented "It was a big game for us to see how we would respond." He added "I thought our competitive character was challenged a little bit in how we prepared this week and how we'd come out in our approach to this game."

Florida 

The Volunteers went to "The Swamp" to play one of their rivalries, the Florida Gators. Florida won the game, 28–27, extending its win streak over Tennessee to 11 games. Volunteers kicker Aaron Medley had a chance to win the game with a 55-yard field goal, but his attempt missed by a foot to the right.

Arkansas 

The Volunteers hosted the Arkansas Razorbacks and hoped to extend their home record to 7–1 against the "Hogs". Tennessee began with an early lead with Evan Berry's 96-yard opening kickoff return and Joshua Dobbs's 7-yard run on the following drive. However, Arkansas tied the game at 17 before halftime and would score the game's only remaining touchdown in the third quarter to go on to win 24–20.

Following the Volunteers' third loss in four games, and blowing a two-touchdown lead in each of those defeats, Coach Butch Jones stated "Our competitive character is being tested. Our fortitude is being tested. All you can do is keep working – and work your way through it."

#19 Georgia 

The 19th-ranked Georgia Bulldogs came to Knoxville even in their series rivalry with Tennessee. Georgia looked to enter halftime with a 24–3 lead, but the Volunteers scored twice within the last 2:30 of the first half to cut the lead to seven. They scored a further 14 unanswered points in the third quarter. The Bulldogs only managed to score one touchdown in the second half and Tennessee mounted its third biggest comeback in school history to win 38–31, thus ending its five-game losing streak to the Bulldogs.

Tennessee coach Butch Jones stated "[Tennessee] had a different look [...] This football team was not going to be denied. They were going to find a way to win the football game. I'm just happy for them because they deserve to have this feeling."

For his overall performance in the game, quarterback Joshua Dobbs earned Southeastern Conference  Offensive Player of the Week honors. Dobbs' combined passing and rushing for over 400 yards marks the second time in both his career and Tennessee's history.

#8 Alabama 

Tennessee entered Bryant–Denny Stadium to face their rivals, the eighth-ranked Alabama Crimson Tide. The 98th meeting between the teams resulted in Alabama winning 19–14 and extending their nine-game winning streak against the Volunteers. The defensive battle saw only two touchdowns from each team, with Alabama stopping a late rally by Tennessee by forcing a fumble from Joshua Dobbs.

Coach Butch Jones stated "I thought our team showed some grit, some determination and some resiliency on the road against a quality opponent, a top 10 opponent, in a hostile environment to go down and drive the ball and put us in a position to win. At the University of Tennessee, there are no moral victories."

Kentucky 

Joshua Dobbs amassed four touchdowns in a 52–21 rout of the Kentucky Wildcats. The Volunteers have won 30 of its last 31 meetings with Kentucky. Evan Berry scored on a 100-yard kickoff return and Cameron Sutton returned an 84-yard punt for a touchdown. Berry's three touchdowns on kickoff returns this season ties Willie Gault's 35-year-old school single-season record. For his performance, Berry was awarded the SEC Special Teams Player of the Week.

South Carolina

Tennessee won the 16th of its 18 home meetings against the South Carolina Gamecocks, 27–24. This marks the series' third consecutive game to be decided by a field goal, the third consecutive Tennessee comeback, and the sixth by three or fewer points. Malik Foreman forced a South Carolina fumble on Tennessee's 13-yard line and Jalen Reeves-Maybin recovered it to end the Gamecocks' 67-yard drive in the final minute. Following the game, Tennessee coach Butch Jones stated "I'm never going to apologize for winning. This is a hard-fought game. We're playing a good football team. I give South Carolina all the credit in the world. ... They're going to have success. We're still building. I'm proud of our players. I'm proud of our program. We need to start being positive around here."

North Texas

For this season's homecoming game, the Volunteers' defense allowed just 199 total yards (the fewest in a game since 2010) in a 24–0 victory over North Texas. Tennessee is now bowl eligible and on a three-game winning streak. However, the Volunteers' offense seemed sluggish, and the Mean Green remained competitive. Tennessee coach Butch Jones stated "There isn't a 'U' behind the 'W' that says 'ugly win'. They're all wins. We have to go back and we have to get better. We're going to be challenged the next couple weeks."

Missouri 

In the final road game of the regular season, Jalen Hurd ran for a career-high 151 rushing yards and Aaron Medley made four field goals to lead Tennessee to a 19–8 win over Missouri at Faurot Field. Hurd's performance put him over 1,000 yards on the season. This is the Volunteers' first win between the teams since the Tigers joined the SEC in 2012. It was also Tennessee's seventh regular-season win, the first since 2009.

Vanderbilt

In the final game of the regular season, Tennessee beat in-state rival Vanderbilt, 53–28. Joshua Dobbs threw two  touchdowns and ran for another, Jalen Hurd scored a touchdown in his 109-yard performance, and Cameron Sutton scored on an 85-yard punt return. The win capped Tennessee's first five-game winning streak, and marked the first time winning at least eight games in a season, since 2007. Following the game, Coach Butch Jones called his team "one of the best teams in the country", adding "our players believe that. There's a lot of positive energy surrounding our program."

#13 Northwestern

Rankings

References

Tennessee
Tennessee Volunteers football seasons
ReliaQuest Bowl champion seasons
Tennessee Volunteers football